The World Seair Corp Seair is an American ultralight trike flying boat that was designed and produced by World Seair Corporation. The aircraft was supplied as a completed, read-to-fly aircraft and introduced in July 1998.

A successor company, Seair Technologies currently produces a similar concept, but different design aircraft, the Seair Technologies Seair Flying Boat that first flew circa 2002.

Design and development
The Seair was designed as a US FAR 103 Ultralight Vehicles two-seat trainer. It features a cable-braced hang glider-style high-wing, weight-shift controls, a two-seats-in-tandem open cockpit, inflatable boat hull and a single engine in pusher configuration.

The aircraft consists of a rigid-bottomed hull, with four independent air chambers, plus two inflatable outriggers. The trike wing is made from bolted-together aluminum tubing, with its single surface wing covered in Dacron sailcloth. The  span wing is supported by a single tube-type kingpost and uses an "A" frame control bar. An optional water rudder is controlled by foot pedals. An instrument panel is provided near the bow of the hull.

The hull can be deflated and the wing folded for storage, ground transportation or stowage on a larger vessel. The aircraft can be assembled for flight in 20 minutes.

Specifications (Seair)

References

1990s United States ultralight aircraft
Single-engined pusher aircraft
Ultralight trikes